Millennium (formerly Millennium Roller Coaster) is a roller coaster at Fantasy Island in Ingoldmells, United Kingdom. It was built by Vekoma, a Dutch roller coaster manufacturer, to celebrate the arrival of the new millennium but despite its name, was opened in May 1999. It was Fantasy Island's first "Extreme Thrill Ride", and circles the park's signature pyramid structure.

Layout and operation
Constructed - and correspondingly named - ahead of the new millennium in 1999, the ride features a vertical loop, a sidewinder and an additional vertical loop. It finishes in a low helix, which swoops down to a level just above head height of those in the amusement park, frequently startling the unsuspecting public. Some of Millennium's track is intertwined with The Odyssey's track supports, providing some Headchoppers especially when near the Odyssey's supports. 

Like the adjacent Odyssey rollercoaster, Millennium is also affected by high winds (though not as significantly as the Odyssey) and so in the case of bad weather or high winds Millennium may not operate.

With a top speed of 55.9 mph, it is the seventh fastest roller coaster in the UK. It is also the fourth tallest British roller coaster, with a maximum height of 45.5 metres.

For years its striking yellow and red paintwork could be seen from several miles away. For the 2018 season opening the ride was given a new train and completely repainted. The track is now purple with green supports and the queue line is now in the Pyramd complex and features LED strip lights down both sides.

In 2011, a man continuously rode Millennium 140 times over two days in order to raise fund for charity.

References

External links
Official Site For Fantasy Island
Millennium on Fantasy Islanders
Millennium Roller Coaster On T-Park

Roller coasters in the United Kingdom
Tourist attractions in Lincolnshire
Roller coasters introduced in 1999